William P. Ruger is an American academic serving as the President of the American Institute for Economic Research. He is also vice president for research and policy at the Charles Koch Institute and the vice president for foreign policy at Stand Together. On September 10, 2020, Ruger was nominated by President Donald Trump to serve as the United States Ambassador to Afghanistan. On January 3, 2021, his nomination was returned to the President under Rule XXXI, Paragraph 6 of the United States Senate.

Education 
Ruger earned a Bachelor of Arts degree from the College of William & Mary and a PhD in politics from Brandeis University. Ruger fought in the War in Afghanistan as a member of the United States Navy Reserve.

Career 
Ruger worked as a professor of political science at Texas State University and the Lyndon B. Johnson School of Public Affairs.

Prior to his nomination, Ruger has advocated for the complete withdrawal of U.S. troops from Afghanistan. Ruger has been associated with the foreign policy realism movement. In September 2020, Ruger was nominated by President Donald Trump to serve as the United States Ambassador to Afghanistan. On January 3, 2021, his nomination was returned to the President under Rule XXXI, Paragraph 6 of the United States Senate.

References 

American political scientists
Brandeis University alumni
College of William & Mary alumni
Living people
United States Navy personnel of the War in Afghanistan (2001–2021)
Year of birth missing (living people)